Christopher McCarthy (June 21, 1931 – April 22, 2009) was an American race walker. He competed for Team USA at the 1964 Summer Olympics in the Men's 50 kilometres walk, finishing 21st with a personal best time 4-35:42.

Achievements

Life 

He was the longest sequentially enrolled graduate student at the University of Chicago, and studied under Leo Strauss (political science).

References
 

1931 births
2009 deaths
American male racewalkers
Athletes (track and field) at the 1964 Summer Olympics
Olympic track and field athletes of the United States